Durai Manivel is an Indian politician and former member of the Tamil Nadu Legislative Assembly from the Ariyalur constituency, represented the Anna Dravida Munnetra Kazhagam party.

References 

Members of the Tamil Nadu Legislative Assembly
All India Anna Dravida Munnetra Kazhagam politicians
Living people
Year of birth missing (living people)